Horsham may refer to places called:

 Horsham, a town in West Sussex, England
 Horsham (district), a local government district in West Sussex
 Horsham (UK Parliament constituency), a County Constituency in West Sussex
 Horsham, Worcestershire, a village in England
 Horsham Township, Pennsylvania, a settlement in the Delaware Valley
 Horsham, Pennsylvania, a census-designated place within Horsham Township
 Horsham, Victoria, Australia

Horsham may also refer to:

 Horsham F.C., a West Sussex football club currently playing in the Isthmian League Premier Division
Horsham Museum, the local history museum for Horsham and its surroundings